The Empire News was a Sunday newspaper in the United Kingdom.

The newspaper was founded in 1884 in Manchester as The Umpire.  A penny newspaper, it was the first successful provincial Sunday newspaper in England.  Owned by H. S. Jennings, the Umpire was subtitled "A Sporting, Athletic, Theatrical and General Newspaper", and focused on sports and theatre news.  In 1894, it absorbed the former daily newspaper, the Manchester Examiner and Times.

In 1917, Edward Hulton bought the paper and renamed it the Empire, and shortly after, the Empire News.  Along with Hulton's other papers, the News was acquired by Lord Beaverbrook and then sold to Lord Rothermere, becoming part of Allied Northern Newspapers and later Kemsley Newspapers.

The paper was renamed the Sunday Empire News in 1944, but in 1950 became the Empire News and the Umpire and in 1953 was back to being the Empire News.  In 1955, the Sunday Chronicle was merged with the Empire News, and the paper's title became the Empire News and the Sunday Chronicle.  Roy Thomson bought the paper in 1959, but he merged it into the News of the World in 1960.

Editors

1948: Terence Horsley
1949: George Grafton Green
1957: L. Harton

References

Newspapers published in Manchester
Publications established in 1884
Publications disestablished in 1960
Defunct Sunday newspapers published in the United Kingdom